Blackburn Correctional Complex (BCC) is a minimum-security state prison located near Lexington, Kentucky. It opened in 1972 and had a prison population of 594 as of 2007.

It is named for former Kentucky governor Luke P. Blackburn, who is known as the "father of prison reform in Kentucky."

References

  

Buildings and structures in Lexington, Kentucky
Prisons in Kentucky
1972 establishments in Kentucky